Kursdorf is a ghost village in Schkeuditz, Saxony, Germany. The site is located near the state border with Saxony-Anhalt. Situated between the two runways of Leipzig/Halle Airport (Germany's second-busiest cargo airport), the village has been described as the "loudest village in Germany." Its population has declined since the mid-20th century, to the point that since 2017, the village has had no inhabitants.

Location 

Kursdorf is located within Leipzig/Halle Airport, in the town of Schkeuditz between Leipzig and Halle (Saale). To the south is runway 08R/26L, and to the north is the Erfurt–Leipzig/Halle high-speed railway (near the Leipzig/Halle Airport station), Autobahn 14, and runway 08L/26R. Being surrounded by runways and taxiways, the only way out of the village is to the east, under an aircraft bridge.

History 

The town has been recorded since at least 1500, originally as Kunsstorf and Kurzsdorf. It was part of Amt Schkeuditz until the 1800s, when  was established. In 1994 the town was annexed into Schkeuditz, which was later reorganized into the districts of Leipziger Land (1994–1999), Delitzsch (1999–2008) and Nordsachsen (2008–).

Unlike most churches, its tower faces east. The altar, dating from 1777, and the organ of the church are still preserved. The building was renovated in 2001.

The population of the village has gradually declined since 1950 (at a peak of around 500), mainly because of excessive noise levels; onsite sensors indicated that the average sound level was over 58.7 decibels due to noise from cars, trains, and planes. Kursdorf was described as a "Schallinferno" (sound inferno) and "das lauteste Dorf Deutschlands" (the loudest village in Germany) by Der Tagesspiegel. The airport became a hub of DHL Aviation, leading to increased noise levels in the nighttime when cargo flights arrive and depart. Residents also described the smell as "almost unbearable" due to fuels like kerosene constantly being burned by vehicles.

The "Friendly Hotel", built in 1997, was sold to the district of Nordsachsen for over 500,000 euros in 2015. It was used to accommodate asylum seekers, of which there were over 600 in the district.

In 2011, 44 vacant houses in the village were demolished for materials, and in 2017, 27 more were demolished for safety reasons. A parking lot was built in their place. The last residents moved out in 2017, making it a ghost town. The church and former school (both under monument protection) remained, as well as the airport's medical center and the Friendly Hotel. The last  (Christmas Eve service) at the church occurred in 2015.

References

External links 
 Unofficial website (in German)
 Illustrated multimedia report by Leipziger Volkszeitung (in German)

Villages in Saxony
Schkeuditz
Nordsachsen
Ghost towns in Germany